Séamus O'Sullivan (born 1954) is an Irish retired Gaelic footballer who played for Cork Championship club Dohenys and at inter-county level with the Cork senior football team. He usually lined out at corner-back or centre-back.

Career

O'Sullivan first came to notice at juvenile and underage levels with the Dohenys club in Dunmanway. He eventually progressed to the adult team and won a Cork IFC title in 1972 before losing to Nemo Rangers in the 1975 Cork SFC final. O'Sullivan first appeared on the inter-county scene with the Cork minor football team and was at centre-back on the team that won the All-Ireland MFC title in 1972. He later later lined out with the under-21 team. Murphy joined the Cork senior football team in 1976 and made a number of appearances before leaving the panel in 1980. He was a member of the team that won the 1979–80 National League title.

Personal life

O'Sullivan later became involved with the Bishopstown club after moving to Cork. His son, Jamie O'Sullivan, was part of Cork's All-Ireland SFC-winning team in 2010.

Honours

Dohenys
Cork Intermediate Football Championship: 1972

Cork
National Football League: 1979–80
Munster Under-21 Football Championship: 1974
All-Ireland Minor Football Championship: 1972
Munster Minor Football Championship: 1972

References

1954 births
Living people
Dohenys Gaelic footballers
Cork inter-county Gaelic footballers